, was a businessman, politician and cabinet minister in the Empire of Japan, serving as a member of the Lower House of the Diet of Japan six times, and twice as a cabinet minister.

Biography 
Hara was born in Ayabe city, Kyoto Prefecture, and was trained as a lawyer, graduating from the predecessor of Chuo University. In 1896, he moved to Hsinchu, Taiwan, where he worked as a judge for the new Japanese colonial government. In June 1901, he became head of the legal association of Tainan Prefecture, and in November 1901 was also made an assistant police commissioner under the Governor-General of Taiwan’s office in Tainan.  Hara resigned in December 1904 to start his own sugar refining business. In December 1906, he was active in promoting the economic development of Taiwan’s east coast, becoming president of a joint venture company in August 1910 sponsoring immigration of Japanese settlers to Hualien County and a director of the company building Hualien Port, and the present of a company to supply electricity to the area.

Hara was first elected to the Lower House as a representative from his wife’s home prefecture of Ibaraki in the 1912 General Election.  He was subsequently reelected five times.

On April 14, 1931, Hara was picked to be Minister of Colonial Affairs under the Wakatsuki administration. On September 10, 1931, he traded that portfolio for that of Railway Minister, which he held to December 13, 1931. He subsequently served as a senior leader of the Rikken Minseitō political party.

Hara died at age 63, and his grave is at the Tama Cemetery in Fuchū, Tokyo. A bronze bust of Hara is located in the Kameshiro Park in Tsuchiura, Ibaraki.

He is the maternal grandfather of Mitsuko Uchida.

References 
 Rengō Puresu Sha, The Japan biographical encyclopedia & who's who, Issue 3 Japan Biographical Research Dept., Rengo Press, Ltd., 1964. page 237

1871 births
1934 deaths
People from Kyoto Prefecture
Members of the House of Representatives (Empire of Japan)
Government ministers of Japan
Chuo University alumni
Rikken Minseitō politicians
Politicians from Kyoto Prefecture